To Save Humanity is a 2015 anthology of 96 essays on global health by authors who range from heads of states, movie stars, scientists at leading universities, activists, and Nobel Prize winners. Each contributor was asked the same question: "What is the single most important thing for the future of global health over the next fifty years?" The collection was edited by University of Miami president Julio Frenk and Canadian scientist Steven J. Hoffman.

Reception 
The Global Strategy Lab called the collection "unparalleled" and "a primer on the major issues of our time and a blueprint for post-2015 health and development," and featured it in their annual conference.

The Health Impact Fund also featured the collection at their conference.

The Lancet described the book as "testimony to the complexity of global health politics," and called it "a reminder that the breadth of individual and institutional engagement with global health cannot be fully captured by one set of global goals."

Vox has republished several of the articles for free online as part of a series titled "One Change to Save the World."

Essays by notable figures

References 

2015 non-fiction books
2015 anthologies
Essay anthologies
Books about health
Global health
Oxford University Press books